Fatuma (theatrically as Hadithi za Kumekucha: Fatuma), is a 2018 Tanzanian drama film directed by Jordan Riber and co-produced by director himself with his parents; John Riber and Louise Riber. It is the sequel to its first feature film Hadithi za Kumekucha:TUNU. The film stars Beatrice Taisamo in lead role along with Ayoub Bombwe and Cathryn Credo in supportive roles. 

The film deals with the rural hard life of a woman with her daughter where she face several challenges when a man interferes her daughter's life. It was filmed at Arusha region of Tanzania. The film also influenced by radio program 'Kumekucha' aired across Tanzania in 2016 and 2017.

Awards 
The film received critical acclaim and won several awards at international film festivals. The film won four awards in the special category for Swahili Movies at the 2018 Zanzibar Film Festival for Best Picture, Best Actress, Best Director, and Best Cinematography. Actress Catherine Credo won the Best Actress award and Jordan Riber won the Best Director award.

Cast
 Beatrice Taisamo as Fatuma
 Ayoub Bombwe as Manyusi
 Cathryn Credo as Neema

References

External links
 
 Fatuma on YouTube

2018 films
Tanzanian drama films
2018 drama films